Kauahi is a surname. Notable people with the surname include:

 Kaliko Kauahi, American actress
 Kani Kauahi (born 1959), American football coach